Gundelia is a low to high (20–100 cm) thistle-like perennial herbaceous plant with latex, spiny compound inflorescences, reminiscent of teasles and eryngos, that contain cream, yellow, greenish, pink, purple or redish-purple disk florets. It is assigned to the family Asteraceae. Flowers can be found from February to May. The stems of this plant dry-out when the seeds are ripe and break free from the underground root, and are then blown away like a tumbleweed, thus spreading the seeds effectively over large areas with little standing vegetation. This plant is native to the eastern Mediterranean and the Middle-East. Opinions differ about the number of species in Gundelia. Sometimes the genus is regarded monotypic, Gundelia tournefortii being a species with a large variability, but other authors distinguish up to nine species, differing in floret color and pubescence. Young stems are cooked and eaten in the Middle-East and are said to taste like a combination of artichoke and asparagus. The plant also contains compounds that have been demonstrated to be effective against a range of ailments.  A large quantity of pollen assigned to Gundelia has been found on the Shroud of Turin, which may suggest that the crown of thorns was made from Gundelia, but this finding has been contested.

It is called Akkoub in Arabic, silifa in Greek, Akuvit ha-Galgal in Hebrew, Kangar, in Armenian and Persian, Kenger in Turkish (derived from Persian), and Kengir (Kurdish: کنگر) or Sisi (Kurdish: سسی) in Kurdish. It's called tumble thistle in English.

Description 

Gundelia tournefortii is a spiny hemicryptophyte with stems 20–100 cm high, that branch from the base, the first growth of the plant consists of a rosette of leaves. All parts contain a milky latex. The parts above the surface break from the root and may be blown away by the wind as a tumbleweed, assisting in the dispersion of the seed. All counts executed so far arrive at eighteen chromosomes (2n=18).

Root, stems and leaves 
The plant develops a woody, vertical rootstock of up to 4 cm in diameter, at the surface usually covered by the remains of old leaves. The leaves are sessile or decurrent at their base with spiny wings, and alternate set along the stems. The lowest leaves are usually 7–30 cm long and 4–16 cm wide, pinnately dissected and the sections of the larger leaves may be pinnately parted themselves, and have a dentate or serrate margin, all tipped with spines. The midvein and sideveins are prominent, whitish, sometimes tinged purple. The leaf surface may be covered in spiderweb-like hairs, that tend to wither away quickly.

Inflorescence 

The stem divides into ten or more branches, each of which is topped by a compound spiny ovoid inflorescence of 4–8 cm in diameter, which may be covered in dense arachnoid hairs. This inflorescence is unusual for members of the family Asteraceae, as each true flowerhead is so far reduced as to only contain one floret, which is surrounded by its own involucre. Five to seven of these monofloral flowerheads combine into secondary flowerheads, each subtended by a spiny bract hardly or substantially longer than the secondary flowerheads, with only the centre floret developing a cypsela, and the surrounding ones only producing pollen. These secondary flowerheads later break free from the globose assembly of flowerheads that sit on the end of each branch of the stem during the tumbleweed-stage. Remarkable for a member of the tribe Cichorieae are also the disk florets, a trait that is further only present in Warionia saharae.

Florets 
The pentameric corollas are usually 7–10  mm long, gloomy purple or yellowish outside, white to bright yellow, greenish, flesh colored or silvery to red purple inside, with spreading narrow lobes of 3–4 mm mm  long  and about 1 mm wide, the tube hairless inside. The five merged anthers form a cylinder of 4–6  mm long, yellow or brownish in color. The style arms are also brownish.

Pollen 
Pollen is covered in acute spines.

Fruit and seed 
The involucral bracts of the secondary flowerheads are merged into a brown, durable, hard cup with a fibery fringe. Each contains only one cypsela of about 8 mm long, 5 mm at its widest, somewhat dorsally compressed, narrow at its base and widest beyond halflength, with the pappus at its tip consisting of a 2 mm high cup, narrowest at its base.

Characters common to all Asteraceae 
Like in all Asteraceae, the pentameric flowers have anthers that are fused together forming a tube through which the style grows. The style picks up the pollen on hairs along its length and splits into two style branches at its tip. These parts sit on an inferior ovary that grows into an indehiscent fruit in which only one seed develops (a so-called cypsela). All florets (in this case only one) are set on a common base (the receptacle), and are surrounded by several rows of bracts, that form an involucre. A particular character of Gudelia that is rare among the Asteraceae is that florets are gender specialised, with the central floret being functionally hermaphrodite and the marginal florets being functionally male.

Characters common to Cichorieae 
Tumble thistles are assigned to the Cichorieae-tribe that shares anastomosing latex canals in both root, stem and leaves, and has flower heads only consisting of one type of floret. In Warionia and Gundelia these are exclusively disk florets, while all other Cichorieae only have ligulate florets. Gundelia is unique in the complex morphology of the inflorescences.

Differences with other genera 
Warionia and Gundelia share a thistle-like appearance, anastomosing latex-ducts, floral heads that only contain disk florets, spurred anthers, and styles with branches and highest part of the scape covered with long hairs. Gundelia however is herbaceous, has monofloral primary flowerheads combined into groups of five to seven, the centre floret hermaphrodite, the marginal florets functionally male, and those groups combined in ovoid spiny florescences at the end of the stem, and spiny leaves, florets dull yellow to dull purple on the inside, purple to rusty on the outside. Warionia is a shrub, has many dandelion-yellow florets in each flowerhead, single or with two or three together at the end of the branches, the leaves dentate but not spiny.

Scolymus is also a thistle-like herbaceaceous perennial with anastomosing latex-ducts, related to Gundelia, but it has many yellow, orange or white ligulate florets in each flowerhead, which are arranged with many in a spike-like inflorescence, or with a few at the end of the stems.

Phytochemistry 
Gundelia contains several essential oils, with large proportions (20-25% each) of thymol and germacrene-D.

Taxonomy

Taxonomic history 
As far as known, the tumble thistle was first collected during an expedition by Leonhard Rauwolf (1573–1575), and this specimen can now be found in the National Herbarium in Leiden, the Netherlands. Tournefort, Von Gundelsheimer and Claude Aubriet also collected this plant while traveling through Greece, Turkey, former Armenia and Persia (1700–1702). Since Von Gundelsheimer was the first to have sighted the plant, his companions began to call it Gundelia. Tournefort already observed the remarkable morphology of the compounded flowerheads. Carl Linnaeus in 1753 adopted and published this name, providing the correct name. Henri Cassini in 1821 suggested to assign this species to the tribe Vernonieae. In 1828 he specified this assignment to the Vernonieae-Rolandreae, a group formalized by Christian Friedrich Lessing as subtribe Rolandrinae in 1831. Following a change in the interpretation of the complex inflorescence, Cassini rejected the interpretation by Linnaeus, and erected the genus Gundelsheimera, which is illegitimate as it is based on the same type specimen. Next, George Bentham and Joseph Dalton Hooker in 1873 placed the species in the tribe Arctotideae, subtribe Gundelieae (corrected name Gundelinae). Pierre Edmond Boissier in 1875 thought this taxon sufficiently divergent to erect the tribe Gundelieae. Karl August Otto Hoffmann misspelled the genus name as Grundelia, while remarking that Gundelsheimera is a synonym. Other authors hesitantly considered a position for Gundelia in the Cardueae sensu lato. It recently has also been combined with Warionia in the tribe Gundelieae by C. Jeffrey.

Number of species 

The earliest descriptions of Gundelia recognise that the corollas could be cream, flesh coloured or purplish. Linnaeus regarded the genus as monospecific, but distinguished plants with purple corollas as variety β. Bornmüller in 1939 distinguished a forma purpurascens. Other infraspecific taxa differ only in leaf characters. Many modern authors recognise only Gundelia tournefortii with a wide variation in corolla color, or both G. tournefortii and a much more uniform G. aragatsi Nersesyan with brown red corollas and very downy inflorescences. Other species distinguished by some authors are  G. armeniaca Nersesyan, G. dersim Vitek, Yüce & Ergin, G. glabra Vitek, Yüce & Ergin and G. munzuriensis Vitek, Yüce & Ergin, G. rosea Al-Taey & Hossain, G. tenuisecta Vitek, Yüce & Ergin and Gundelia vitekii Armağan.

Modern classification 
Debate on the number of subtaxa remains and some authors think there is only one species, Gundelia tournefortii. Others also recognise G. aragatsi, a form only known from Armenia, that has brown red corollas and very felty inflorescences. Some even distinguish up to nine different taxa. Gundelia is now assigned to the Cichorieae-tribe, as the basal member of the  Scolyminae-subtribe.

Phylogeny 
According to recent genetic analyses, the genus Gundelia is related to the genera Hymenonema, Scolymus and Catananche. This results in the following relationship tree.

Etymology 
Pedanius Dioscorides called this plant silybum. The genus Gundelia is named to honor Andreas von Gundelsheimer (1668–1715), a German botanist, while the species name  tournefortii was named after Joseph Pitton de Tournefort, a French botanist, who together undertook a botanical journey to the Levant, during which the species was collected, described and illustrated.

Distribution 
The tumble thistle can be found in Cyprus, Turkey (Anatolia), Armenia, Azerbaijan, Northern Iraq, northern Iran, Afghanistan, western Syria, Turkmenistan, Kazakhstan, Uzbekistan, Israel, Palestine, Lebanon, Jordan, and Egypt. It has been introduced in Algeria.

Ecology 
Gundelia grows on limestone, igneous rock or reddish soils, in steppe, open oak or pine woodland, or between coppices, as weed in barley- or cornfields, fallowed or deserted fields, and in roadsides. It can be found at altitudes up to 2500 m. It is pollinated by insects such as honey bees and pollen feeding beetles, such as the Garden Chafer.

Cultivation 
Seeds germinate slowly and may take several years. Seedlings can be planted outside but required light, well-drained soil, and protection against frost. Growth is slow during the first year. Plants can be grown in the rock garden, or on raised beds. Gundelia is probably hardy to about −15 °C when the drainage is good. Plants have been grown intermittently at the École de Botanique and in what is currently known as the Jardin des Plantes, Paris, since the 18th century.

Use

Food 
Early in the year, Gundelia plants growing in the wild are cut at the base and the thorns are removed. Leaves, stems, roots, and particularly the undeveloped flowerheads can be eaten. The base of the young leaves which is still under the surface is used by Bedouin and Arabs to make akkub soup. In the West Bank, young flowerheads, stems and leaves are fried in olive oil, mixed with a stew of meat chops until well done, and served mixed with yogurt. Gundelia is said to taste like something between asparagus and artichoke. Another dish is to put a trimmed inflorescence in a meatball, fry these in olive oil and then simmer them in a sauce containing lemon juice. In the mountainous area in south Kurdistan (Iraqi Kurdistan), Gundelia is still being used as a vegetable, but in Israel where it is numbered among the few, wild edible plants, collecting for the market resulted in a decline in the plant population and collecting is restricted to personal use.

A chewing gum can be made from the latex, a fact that is already mentioned by Tournefort in 1718, and is called "kenger sakızı" in Turkish. The fruits as well as roots can be roasted and ground to be used as substitute coffee, and is known as "kenger kahvesi". In recent times, mature seeds have been used to extract oil. Remains of charred inflorescences of Gundelia from the neolithic found in Turkey and Iraq indicate that oil was pressed from the seeds as long as at least 10,000  years ago.
The seeds are edible (called سِسّي "Sissi" in Iraq); dried, salted and roasted are sold in nut shops, they taste similar to sun flower seeds.

The cypselas contain almost 7% oleic acid and 12½% linoleic acid, making the oil comparable to soybean, corn, sunflower and sesame oils. Commercial use would be dependent on plant breeding to improve crop yield, suitability for harvesting and for food processing, such as selection of spineless plants.

Medical uses 
Traditionally, Gundelia is used to treat a wide variety of ailments such as liver diseases, diabetes, chest pain, heart attacks, pain in the chest and the stomach, leukoderma, diarrhea and bronchitis. In addition hypoglycaemic, laxative, sedative, anti-inflammatory, anti-parasite, antiseptic and emetic effects have been claimed, as well as improvement of the gums and curing spleen enlargement. Proven effects include antibacterial, anti-inflammatory, hepatoprotective, antioxidant, antiplatelet and cholesterol suppression.

Fodder 
Fully grown foliage is used to feed livestock in spite of the spines, both fresh (in Syria and Palestine) and dry (in Kurdistan and Iran).

Culture 
In 1998 pollen found on the Shroud of Turin was analysed and with 29%, the pollen assigned to Gundelia was the most numerous. Such a high density makes it very unlikely that this would merely be the result of the Shroud having been exposed to the wind, particularly because Gundelia is an insect-pollinated, not a wind-pollinated plant. Some researchers have suggested this implies that the crown of thorns was made from Gundelia-branches. Other authors doubt the accuracy of the pollen analysis and of the process of gathering the pollen from the Shroud. One reason for doubt is that during the period that pollen is present in the plant, the thorns would have still been tender. It was suggested the pollen is from Helichrysum-species which have a similar type of pollen. Helichrysum was used in classical times to make crowns and garlands for the diseased because they do not wither and remain scented for a long time. An alternative explanation suggested is that rather more recent different flowers have been pressed against the Shroud to create contact relics, while in the process contaminating it with pollen and therefore diluting the original pollen signature.

Some Bible scholars think that the tumbleweed that is spoken of in Psalm 83, verse 14 "Make them like tumbleweed, O my God, like galgal before the wind" is Gundelia. Akkub, the biblical name for this species, is already mentioned in the Babylonian Talmud.

References 

Cichorieae
Flora of Western Asia
Flora of Greece
Flora of Cyprus
Flora of Palestine (region)
Asteraceae genera